Vision Brisbane (or simply Vision) was a planned  skyscraper in Brisbane, Australia. The design was 72 storeys high, and would have become Brisbane's tallest, Queensland's second tallest, and Australia's third tallest building if completed. The design was scrapped and replaced by two new buildings, known by the name 111+222.

Designed by the Buchan Group and developed by Austcorp, Vision's estimated value on completion was predicted to be A$900 million.

Vision's Plaza was designed to provide a mid-block link between Mary Street and Margaret Street. A total of 7,390 square metres of lettable retail space was to be located within the main tower according to development application lodged with the city council. The public plaza was to include water features and several commissioned works of art.

The 376 apartments within the residential component were planned to consist of 96 four-bedroom, 108 three-bedroom, 52 two-bedroom and 120 single-bedroom units. The commercial space totaled 37,431 square metres, comprising the first 13 levels of the main tower and the associated commercial wing extending towards Mary Street.

History
The development was approved in early December 2006, and on-site construction of the tower commenced in September 2007. The development was due for completion in late 2009 to early 2010. Due to funding issues, and the 2008 global financial crisis, the completion of the tower has been put on hold. It is expected that the car park will not be completed until the owners decide whether or not to proceed with the building in its current form, or to begin building in stages as part of the original design.

Brisbane city Vision Tower project site sold. The site has been bought by Bilbergia who plan to construct a similar building to the original. Following the January 2011 flood in Brisbane, the abandoned seven level hole filled with floodwater, prompting the Brisbane City Council to make inspections. On May 18 two new  &  skyscrapers were proposed for the site by the Bilbergia Group and were approved in November 2011.

In November 2014, one of the buildings in 111+222 development–the Brisbane Skytower–which later would be built on the building site, was approved for construction. It was completed in 2019.

Gallery

See also

List of tallest buildings in Brisbane

References

External links 
 
 Construction progress photo gallery

Unbuilt buildings and structures in Australia
Skyscrapers in Brisbane